Pomabamba (Quechua Pumapampa, puma cougar, pampa large plain, "cougar plain")  is a town in the Pomabamba District of the Pomabamba Province in the Ancash Region of Peru.

References

External links
  Official website of the Pomabamba province

Populated places in the Ancash Region